Maurice or Morris Bell may refer to:
Sir Maurice Bell, 3rd Baronet (1871–1944), British soldier
Morris Frederick Bell (1849–1929), American architect

See also
Bell (surname)